In adoption studies, selective placement refers to the practice by which adoption agencies tend to deliberately match certain characteristics of an adopted child's adopted parents with those of his or her biological parents. When this occurs, it results in a correlation between environments between biological relatives raised in different homes. It has the potential to bias the conclusions of such studies, because twins who were reared in separate environments may in fact have been reared in much more similar environments than assumed. This can result in an inflated estimate of heritability. There is evidence that selective placement was a major confound in many early studies of twins reared apart. Some adoption studies report little or no evidence of selective placement. For example, a 1979 study by Ho et al. reported a generally low level of selective placement in adopted children for either physical or behavioral traits. The authors concluded that to the extent that selective placement occurred for such traits, "our data suggest that it is based largely on characteristics of the birth father," rather than those of the adoptee. Carey (2003) concluded that selective placement was "moderate" for physical characteristics and typically "small or nonexistent" for behavioral characteristics.

References

Adoption
Behavioural genetics